A line impedance stabilization network (LISN) is a device used in conducted and radiated radio-frequency emission and susceptibility tests, as specified in various electromagnetic compatibility (EMC)/EMI test standards (e.g., by CISPR, International Electrotechnical Commission, CENELEC, U.S. Federal Communications Commission, MIL-STD, DO-160 Sections 20-21-22).

A LISN is a low-pass filter typically placed between an AC or DC power source and the EUT (equipment under test) to create a known impedance and to provide a radio frequency (RF) noise measurement port. It also isolates the unwanted RF signals from the power source. In addition, LISNs can be used to predict conducted emission for diagnostic and pre-compliance testing.

Functions of an LISN

Stable line impedance
The main function of a LISN is to provide a precise impedance to the power input of the EUT, in order to get repeatable measurements of the EUT noise present at the LISN measurement port. This is important because the impedance of the power source and the impedance of the EUT effectively operate as a voltage divider. The impedance of the power source varies, depending on the geometry of the supply wiring behind it.

The anticipated inductance of the power line for the intended installation of the EUT also plays a role in identifying the correct type of LISN needed for testing. For example, a connection in a building will often use 50 μH inductor, whereas in automobile measurement standards a 5 μH inductor is used to emulate a shorter typical wire length.

Isolation of the power source noise

Another important function of a LISN is to prevent the high-frequency noise of the power source from coupling in the system. A LISN functions as a low-pass filter, which provides high impedance to the outside RF noise while allowing the low-frequency power to flow through to the EUT.

Safe connection of the measuring equipment

Typically, a spectrum analyzer or an EMI receiver is used to take the measurements during an EMC test. The input port of such an equipment is very sensitive and prone to damage if overloaded. A LISN provides a measurement port with, usually, 50 Ω output impedance. The stabilized impedance, the built-in low-pass filter function, and the DC rejection properties of the LISN measurement port makes it easy to couple the high frequency noise signal to the input of the measuring equipment.

LISN types
Under a particular EMC test standard, a specific LISN type is required for evaluating and characterizing the operation of the EUT.

Different types of LISNs are available for analyzing DC, single-phase or 3-phase AC power connections. The main parameters for selecting the proper type of LISN are impedance, insertion loss, voltage rating, current rating, number of power conductors and connector types. The upper frequency limit of the LISN also plays an important role when conducted emissions measurements are used for predicting radiated emissions problems. A 100 MHz LISN is used in those cases.

Notes

References

Sources 
MIL-STD 461E, REQUIREMENTS FOR THE CONTROL OF ELECTROMAGNETIC INTERFERENCE CHARACTERISTICS OF SUBSYSTEMS AND EQUIPMENT, 1999

Laboratory equipment
Electronic test equipment